Robert Edwin Reeves (June 24, 1904 – June 4, 1993) was an infielder in Major League Baseball who played from 1926 through 1931 for the Washington Senators (1926–28) and Boston Red Sox (1929–31). A native of Hill City, Tennessee, he was signed by Washington out of the Georgia Institute of Technology. 
 
A versatile utility man, Reeves was able to play all positions except catcher. He made 479 appearances at third base (229), shortstop, second base (67), first base (1), right field (1), and also served as an emergency pitcher (1). 
 
Reeves posted career-numbers with a .303 batting average and 46 RBI for the 1928 Washington Senators, before being dealt in a five-for-one trade to the Boston Red Sox along with Elliot Bigelow, Milt Gaston, Grant Gillis, and Hod Lisenbee in exchange for Buddy Myer. In 1929, he posted a career-high 140 games with Boston, including 131 appearances as the team's regular third base.
 
In a six-season career, Reeves was a .252 hitter (402-for-1598) with eight home runs and 135 RBI in 502 games, including 203 runs, 55 doubles, eight triples, 21 stolen bases, and a .331 on-base percentage. 
 
Reeves died in Chattanooga, Tennessee, 20 days short of his 89th birthday.

Sources

External links

Boston Red Sox players
Washington Senators (1901–1960) players
Major League Baseball infielders
Georgia Tech alumni
Baseball players from Tennessee
1904 births
1993 deaths